Hachemi Larbi Boussaâda (born February 25, 1978 in Mascara) is an Algerian footballer. He currently plays for ASM Oran in the Algerian Ligue Professionnelle 2.

Club career
Born in Mascara, however start playing in senior in Mostaganem one season with WA Mostaganem on 2003, after he return in his native city and played with GC Mascara. One year later, he signed with CA Bordj Bou Arréridj but returned in 2006. On 2008, he left the team to join MC Oran. On 2012 he signed with ASM Oran.

References

External links
 Hachemi Boussaâda, best player of MC Oran in May 2011 - mouloudia.com

1978 births
Living people
Algerian footballers
MC Oran players
ASM Oran players
People from Mascara, Algeria
GC Mascara players
CA Bordj Bou Arréridj players
WA Mostaganem players
Algerian Ligue Professionnelle 1 players
Association football defenders
21st-century Algerian people